The Calliopean Society (the Fraternity of Phi Epsilon Mu) is a literary and debating society at Yale College founded in 1819, disbanded in 1853, and revived in 1950. Its name refers to Calliope, chief of the muses and muse of epic poetry, daughter of Zeus and Mnemosyne (memory).

History

First incarnation: 1819-1853 
Calliopean was founded in 1819 by a group of members of Linonia dissatisfied with the result of an election for the presidency of the latter society.  

The name may allude The Calliopean Society of New York City, which operated from the 1780s until 1831. The New York City Society has been described as "a queer assemblage...a club of bachelors who celebrated their indolent disengagement from the Anglo-American power establishment... and used their marginal position to prospect truths not viewed by useful and virtuous citizens of the Republic. They were one of the first of the type of masculine literary cabal that would become common after 1800: the sort of club that Washington Irving, the prince of old bachelors, nourished and that the young Federalist bachelors of arts formed after graduating from Harvard and finding themselves locked out of the halls of power by Thomas Jefferson. The groups collected the odd fellows who had given up on cultivating character and civic virtue and domestic responsibility and patriarchy and opted instead for projecting personality, indulging genius, pursuing pleasure, and damning commerce. [It] was an early version of that sort of humorous society of eccentrics portrayed by Charles Dickens in The Pickwick Papers."  

Another literary society of the same name had been formed in Bermuda in 1790 by George Tucker, at that time under the tutelage of Josiah Meigs, who later became Professor of Moral Philosophy at Yale.

At Yale, Calliopean was distinguished from rival societies Linonia and Brothers-In-Unity by a larger proportion of membership from Southern states. Increasing sectional tensions before the American Civil War caused Calliopean to disband in 1853.

Second incarnation: 1950 to date 
It was revived in 1950 as a conservative alternative to New Deal liberalism and mainstream Republican student groups at Yale.

For a bit over a decade from the 1950s through the early 1960s, the Calliopean Society conducted a program of debates and meetings featuring guest speakers, and maintained its own library. M. Stanton Evans, Class of 1955, later a syndicated columnist and conservative activist, was one of the presidents of Calliopean during that period. In the mid-1960s, Calliopean officership became an honorific distinction passed down among prominent libertarian leaders of the Party of the Right of the Yale Political Union. Party of the Right membership commonly overlapped with Calliopean.

Calliopean was subsequently remodeled into a Senior Honorary Society, on the models of the Aurelian Honor Society and the Torch Honor Society. Membership was limited to people in the Yale College senior class, but officers (appointed by the president) could be chosen from any class. Membership was annually awarded each spring by the Calliopean president and director (on a non-political basis) to rising seniors of exceptional spirit, intelligence, and talent.  

Calliopean became increasingly active during the 1970s during the presidency of Martin D. "Chip" Gatter, Class of 1973, holding annual parties and special events in unusual locations in accordance with a cryptic constitutional provision permitting official meetings to be held only "on street corners and in dark alleys" and adopting a program of promoting "intellectual diversity at any cost". 

For many decades, the Calliopean Society had no physical location, listing itself as located at "1985 Yale Station, New Haven, Connecticut 06520". Its 1985 box number had been chosen to refer to the inevitable victory of the West over the collectivist totalitarianism described in George Orwell's novel Nineteen Eighty-Four. 

During much of the 1970s and 1980s, Calliopean was given by the university use of the attic space in Bingham Hall equipped with an old observatory dome.

Legacy 
Calliope is commemorated on the Yale University campus by Calliope Court, one of three small courtyards within Branford College. These courtyards were named for literary societies that donated their libraries to Yale.

References

Student societies in the United States
Student debating societies
Yale University Library
College literary societies in the United States